Adiat Sade Disu (born 1987) is an American, marketing and communications executive in the fields of mass media, information technology, and consumer products. Her parents are Nigerian and Ghanaian.

Adiat Disu founded a multi media company called Adirée offering cross-cultural media, marketing, and retail sales services, with headquarters in New York. Adirée founded the annual consumer-marketing & communications platform AfricaFashionWeek.com with off-shoots in local cities (example: Africa Fashion Week New York during New York Fashion Week in 2009.

Adiat Disu also writes for Entrepreneur magazine.

Background and education
Adiat Disu studied at Phillips Exeter Academy in Exeter, New Hampshire before she was admitted to Bentley University, in Waltham, Massachusetts. She graduated from Bentley University in 2008, with a Bachelor of Science in Information Technology,  Marketing & Communications. Adiat Disu went on to Tuck School of Business at Dartmouth College where she received Executive Education in Digital Leadership and Management.

Career
In February 2009, straight out of university, Adiat Disu established an omni-medial, marketing and retail company with headquarters in New York and a satellite branch in Lagos, Nigeria.  The group's client list includes corporate and social enterprises, government and non-for-profit agencies, individual lifestyle, and media brands such as: Verisk Analytics, that lasted four months in 2016 and another with Hearst Magazines (developing and launching Heart Magazines' first media site in West Africa), beauty brand by Kimora Lee Simmons' Shinto Clinical,Iman Cosmetics, Pikolinos Shoes, USAID (United States Agency of International Development), as well as celebrities like Korto Momolu and Akon.

Honors and recognition 
Adiat Disu and her work has been recognized in :
2011: CNN,  Founder of media and marketing platform: Africa Fashion Week.
2011: Washington Post, Creatives Bringing Africa to the World.
2011:Bullet Magazine, Wrap It Up   
2012: Black Enterprise, Everyday Hero. 
2013: Huffington Post, Founder of Africa Fashion Week. 
2013: Huffington Post,,Africa Fashion Week, produced by Adirée
2013: Global Post,  Adiree, Communications and Brand Strategy Firm.
2014: Forbes Magazine,30 Under 30. 
2014: Black Enterprise,  Founder of Adiree, the Premier Communications and Branding firm, in New York for Africa's Global Leaders.
2015: Africa Channel, Adirée, the Communications and Brand Strategy Company.
2016: Huffington Post,Adiat Disu, Entrepreneur and Forbes 30 Under 30.
2017: Entrepreneur Magazine,  Information Technology and Communications Executive.

See also
Bozoma Saint John
Mo Abudu 
Susan Oguya
Tebogo Mashego

References

External links
Profile at Entrepreneur magazine's website.

1987 births
Nigerian women in business
Dartmouth College alumni
Phillips Exeter Academy alumni
Bentley University alumni
Living people